Saint Fillan was a sixth-century Scottish monk active in Fife. His feast day is 20 June.

Fillan of Pittenweem is not to be confused with the later Fillan of Munster, who settled at Strath Fillan. Fillan of Pittenweem worked in Aberdour, (where the parish church bears his name), as well as in Forgan. On the top of Dunfillan near Comrie was a rocky seat where, according to tradition, Fillan sat and gave his blessing to the country 'round. Up until the eighteenth century, there was a belief that sitting there could be beneficial for rheumatism of the back. A stone basin at the bottom the hill, was known as "Fillan's Spring", whose water was said to cure sore eyes.

According to historian and antiquary William Forbes Skene, the village of St Fillans, on the eastern end of Loch Earn, takes its name from him.

Fillan of Pittenweem died at the disert of Tyrie near Kinghorn

St Fillan's Cave
St Fillan's Cave, situated in Cove Wynd, Pittenweem has long been associated with Fillan. The cave has flat rocks that are presumed to have been used as beds and a small spring of "holy water" at its rear and a well. The cave was a stopping off point for pilgrims on their way to St Andrews or St. Ethernan's shrine on the Isle of May.

Antiquarian Robert Sibbald says that in 1100, Edgar, King of Scotland gave Pittenweem to the Culdees. Later, 
David I of Scotland granted the monks of the Priory of St. Mary the Virgin on the Isle of May the manor of Pittenweem, where they erected the Priory of St. Adrian over the ancient cave associated with Saint Fillan. A stairway was built by the monks of the priory from the cave, ending in a vaulted cellar in the Priory grounds.

The cave was also used by smugglers for some time, and as a store room for local fisherfolk (Pittenweem has been a fishing village since the time of early Christian settlement and later a harbour was constructed). It served as a prison during the witch hunts of the 17-18th centuries and was used as a rubbish tip which probably resulted in its disappearance for some time.

The cave was rediscovered about 1900 when a horse ploughing in the Priory garden fell down a hole into it.  It was rededicated as a place of worship by the Bishop of St. Andrews in 1935. It has since been refurbished and opened to visitors as of October 2000, and is owned by the Bishop Low Trust. It is entrusted to St John's Scottish Episcopal Church in Pittenweem, and is open to the public.

See also
 Pittenweem Priory

References

Christian saints in unknown century
Year of birth missing
Year of death missing
British Benedictines
Benedictine saints
Fife
Medieval Scottish saints
Scottish Roman Catholic priests